Manusha Nanayakkara (born 24 September 1977) is a Sri Lankan politician, Cabinet Minister, and a current Member of Parliament for the Galle District. He is a journalist by profession and was educated at Mahinda College, Galle.He was appointed as the Minister of Labour and Foreign Employment on the 20th of May 2022.

References

External links
Sri Lanka Parliament profile

1977 births
Living people
Sri Lankan journalists
Members of the 14th Parliament of Sri Lanka
Members of the 15th Parliament of Sri Lanka
Members of the 16th Parliament of Sri Lanka
Provincial councillors of Sri Lanka
Alumni of Mahinda College
Sinhalese politicians
Samagi Jana Balawegaya politicians